Astragalus canadensis is a common and widespread member of the milkvetch genus in the legume family, known commonly as Canadian milkvetch. The plant is found throughout Canada and the United States in many habitats including wetlands, woodlands, and prairies. It sends out several thin, erect, green stems, bearing leaves that are actually made up of pairs of leaflets, each leaflet up to 3 centimeters in length. It has inflorescences of tubular, greenish-white flowers which yield beanlike fruits within pods that rattle when dry.

Like other Astragalus species, A. canadensis is somewhat toxic, but it has been used medicinally by Native American groups such as the Blackfoot and Lakota people, particularly the roots.

Gallery of photos

External links
USDA Plants Profile
Photo Gallery
Native Plants of Texas
Ethnobotany

canadensis
Flora of Alabama
Flora of Canada
Plants used in traditional Native American medicine
Plants described in 1753
Taxa named by Carl Linnaeus